Omar Cummings (born 13 July 1982) is a former Jamaican international footballer who played as a forward. He spent his entire professional career in the United States.

Career

Youth and amateur
Cummings attended Jonathan Grant High School, Cincinnati State College and the University of Cincinnati, where he majored in criminal justice.

Professional

Cummings was selected by the Colorado Rapids in the 2007 MLS SuperDraft as a Round 3, number 31 overall pick. On 4 September 2010, Cummings scored two goals to help the Rapids to a 3–0 victory over Chivas USA at Dick's Sporting Goods Park. The performance led to him being voted as Major League Soccer Player of the Week for Week 23 of the MLS season by the North American Soccer Reporters (NASR). On 27 December 2010, it was announced that the Colorado Rapids had granted Cummings permission to trial with English Premier League club Aston Villa. On 17 January 2011, Aston Villa manager Gérard Houllier announced that Cummings had impressed on the trial. Due to work permit issues, a deal did not proceed.

Having returned to play for Colorado again in 2010, Cummings made his 100th MLS appearance for the Rapids on 30 April 2010, in a game against Chicago Fire.

On 22 December 2012 Cummings was traded to Houston Dynamo in exchange for Nathan Sturgis and allocation money. He remained with Houston for two years.

In 2015, Cummings signed with San Antonio Scorpions of the North American Soccer League. He enjoyed a successful season, scoring 10 goals in 29 matches.

On 21 January 2016, Cummings signed with expansion side FC Cincinnati of the United Soccer League.

On 23 July 2017, FC Cincinnati announced that Cummings would be retiring from professional soccer. He played his final match the following day in an international friendly against Valencia CF. During the match's halftime, the club honored Cummings with a brief ceremony and presented him with a framed jersey. Following his retirement, Cummings joined the front office of FC Cincinnati working on youth academy and community initiatives.

International
Cummings made his international debut for Jamaica in July 2008.

International goals

Personal life
Cummings is the cousin of fellow soccer players Rafe Wolfe, Wolry Wolfe and Kemeel Wolfe.

Cummings holds a U.S. green card which qualifies him as a domestic player for MLS roster purposes.

References

External links
 
 

1982 births
Living people
Jamaican footballers
Jamaica international footballers
Cincinnati Bearcats men's soccer players
Colorado Rapids players
Houston Dynamo FC players
San Antonio Scorpions players
FC Cincinnati (2016–18) players
Expatriate soccer players in the United States
Association football forwards
People from Saint Catherine Parish
Major League Soccer players
Major League Soccer All-Stars
North American Soccer League players
2009 CONCACAF Gold Cup players
2011 CONCACAF Gold Cup players
Jamaican expatriate sportspeople in the United States
Jamaican expatriate footballers
Colorado Rapids draft picks
All-American men's college soccer players
USL Championship players
FC Cincinnati non-playing staff